Syphonota geographica, or the geographic sea hare, is a species of sea slug or sea hare, a marine opisthobranch gastropod mollusk in the family Aplysiidae, the sea hares.

This is the only species within this genus, in other words, Syphonota is a monotypic genus.

Distribution

Description
Syphonota differs from the other Aplysiidae genera, through the position of the rhinophores (head tentacles), which are further back, almost between the parapodial lobes. The parapodia, fleshy winglike outgrowths, come to a noticeable high point at the top of the animal.
 
The body coloration is whitish to green, with brown specks and a complicated network of white lines (hence the name 'geographica').

The maximum recorded length is 170 mm.

Habitat
This sea hare lives in lagoons and bays on sandy substrates.

Minimum recorded depth is 6 m. Maximum recorded depth is 7.5 m.

References

 Bebbington A. (1974) Aplysiid species from East Africa with notes on the Indian Ocean Aplysiomorpha (Gastropoda: Opisthobranchia). Zoological Journal of the Linnean Society 54(1): 63-99.
 Turgeon, D.; Quinn, J.F.; Bogan, A.E.; Coan, E.V.; Hochberg, F.G.; Lyons, W.G.; Mikkelsen, P.M.; Neves, R.J.; Roper, C.F.E.; Rosenberg, G.; Roth, B.; Scheltema, A.; Thompson, F.G.; Vecchione, M.; Williams, J.D. (1998). Common and scientific names of aquatic invertebrates from the United States and Canada: mollusks. 2nd ed. American Fisheries Society Special Publication, 26. American Fisheries Society: Bethesda, MD (USA). . IX, 526 + cd-rom pp. (look up in IMIS) page(s): 122
 Mollo E., Gavagnin M., Carbone M., Castelluccio F., Pozone F., Roussis V., Templado J., Ghiselin M.T. & Cimino G., 2008: Factors promoting marine invasions: A chemoecological approach, Proceedings of the National Academy of Sciences 105(12): 4582–4586 
 Rosenberg, G., F. Moretzsohn, and E. F. García. 2009. Gastropoda (Mollusca) of the Gulf of Mexico, pp. 579–699 in Felder, D.L. and D.K. Camp (eds.), Gulf of Mexico–Origins, Waters, and Biota. Biodiversity. Texas A&M Press, College Station, Texas

External links 

 Syphonota geographica at Sea Slug Forum

Aplysiidae
Molluscs of the Indian Ocean
Molluscs of the Mediterranean Sea
Molluscs of the Pacific Ocean
Gastropods described in 1850
Taxa named by Henry Adams (zoologist)
Taxa named by Arthur Adams (zoologist)
Taxa named by Lovell Augustus Reeve